The flag of Eastern Province, was adopted for the Eastern Province of Sri Lanka on 22 May 2007.

History
With the Supreme Court ruling that by 2007 the 1987 order of merging the two provinces, under the Indo-Sri Lanka Accord, Northern and Eastern was illegal and therefore the two provinces must be administered separately. This meant two separate flags for the Northern and Eastern provinces.

The Eastern Province flag was unveiled along with the Flag of Northern Province in Trincomalee, in May 2007. The Governor of the Eastern Province Rear Admiral Mohan Wijewickrema, also at the time the acting Governor of the Northern Province, handed over the two flags to each of the province's respective council's Chief Secretary S. Rangarajah of the North, and Herath Abeyeweera, of the East at a ceremony at the Governor's Secretariat.

Symbolism
The three symbols on the Eastern Province flag symbolises the three districts of the province. The Eagle symbolises Trincomalee, the fish Batticaloa and the lion Ampara.

Controversy
The Sri Lanka Muslim Congress, the major political party for the Sri Lankan Moors, says that the new Eastern Province flag design does not represent the Muslim community. Hassan Ali, the Deputy Minister of Supplementary Crops Development, raised the issue at the adjournment debate in the House not accepting the new flag that did not symbolize the Muslim community.

See also
 Flag of Sri Lanka
 List of Sri Lankan flags

References

External links
 Eastern Provincial Council
 Flagspot
 Sri Lanka.Asia

Eastern Province
Eastern Province
Eastern Province, Sri Lanka
Eastern Province
Flags displaying animals